Rhopalophorini is a tribe of beetles in the subfamily Cerambycinae, containing the following genera:

 Aguassay
 Argyrodines
 Brachylophora
 Closteropus
 Coremia
 Cosmisoma
 Cycnoderus
 Dihammaphora
 Dihammaphoroides
 Dirocoremia
 Disaulax
 Gurubira
 Haenkea
 Ischionodonta
 Lathusia
 Listroptera
 Meringodes
 Merocoremia
 Muxbalia
 Neozodes
 Parozodes
 Potiapua
 Rhopaliella
 Rhopalophora
 Rhopalophorella
 Thalusia
 Timabiara

References

 
Taxa described in 1845